Emma Härdelin (born 26 September 1975) is a Swedish musician. She is a violinist and lead singer in folk-rock band Garmarna, which she joined in 1993 for their first album, and also lead singer for the folk band Triakel.

Härdelin was born into a family of nationally acclaimed musicians as the daughter of Swedish traditional fiddler Thore Härdelin. She grew up in Kluk, Jämtland, and Delsbo, Hälsingland. After attending a Waldorf school and studying Swedish folk singing under Maria Röjås at Malung folkhögskola, she became a member of Garmarna in 1993 and founded Triakel in 1995 together with Kjell-Erik Eriksson of Hoven Droven and Janne Strömstedt.

In 2004, she appeared on Blindside's album About a Burning Fire, on the song Shekina. 2005 saw the release of Kärleksbrev och ryska satelliter, a folk album by Härdelin, Kersti Ståbi, Johanna Bölja Hertzberg, and Katarina Hallberg.  She also performs on a recording of Swedish music from Estonia entitled Strand...Rand. In 2007, Emma released an album with String Sisters, a sextet featuring other fiddlers including Altan's Mairéad Ní Mhaonaigh.

References

1975 births
Living people
Swedish folk singers
Swedish fiddlers
Nordic folk musicians
Waldorf school alumni
Fiddlers from Sweden
String Sisters members
21st-century violinists